Zubovce is a village in the municipality of Vrapčište, North Macedonia.

Demographics
As of the 2021 census, Zubovce had 844 residents with the following ethnic composition:
Macedonians 428
Albanians 278
Turks 120
Persons for whom data are taken from administrative sources 15
Others 3

According to the 2002 census, the village had a total of 762 inhabitants. Ethnic groups in the village include:
Macedonians 478
Albanians 223
Turks 58
Serbs 2
Others 1

References

Villages in Vrapčište Municipality
Albanian communities in North Macedonia